is a Japanese webmanga series written and illustrated by Fujita. It was first posted on Pixiv in April 2014. It began serialization in Comic Pool, a joint web manga publication project by Ichijinsha and Pixiv, in November 2015. Ichijinsha began publishing the manga in print in April 2015 and eleven volumes were published, with over 10 million copies printed, including digital edition, . An anime adaptation by A-1 Pictures aired from April to June 2018 on the Noitamina programming block, while a live-action film adaptation premiered in February 2020.

Plot
The main characters are Narumi, an office working woman who hides her fujoshi lifestyle, and Hirotaka, a handsome and capable company man who is a game otaku. The two seem perfect for each other, but love is difficult for otaku.

Characters

Narumi is a fujoshi otaku, who also likes otome games, and idols. She blames being an otaku for difficulties in her life and attempts to keep it a secret, especially at work. She is also the childhood friend and girlfriend of Hirotaka Nifuji.

Hirotaka is Narumi Momose's otaku friend and boyfriend, who has been in love with her ever since childhood. Hirotaka is a gamer otaku who spends most of his free time gaming and unlike Narumi, he does not care if everyone knows that he is an otaku. He is also considered to be very attractive by the ladies, although he doesn't seem to care. 

Hanako is Narumi Momose's senpai at the office, she is secretly a famous cosplayer otaku who usually cosplays as male characters. She also plays games and reads yaoi manga. Hanako is married to Tarou Kabakura.

Tarou is Hirotaka Nifuji's coworker at the office and a less intense otaku; he likes heroes and bishojo. Tarou is married to Hanako Koyanagi.

Naoya is Hirotaka's cheery younger brother; a university student. Naoya cares very deeply for his brother, and quietly worries about him and his introverted nature. Unlike his brother, Naoya is not an otaku, and is very bad at video games.

Kō is a socially anxious solo gamer from Naoya's university with a habit of saying "I'm sorry". Kō's reclusive nature initially reminds Naoya of his brother and thus decided to become Kō's gamer friend. Naoya brings her into his group of friends - not realizing she's female until later.
Narrator

Production
Initially, Fujita began posting the manga on Pixiv, a Japanese online community for artists, as a rookie author. Ichijinsha then launched a digital manga magazine with Pixiv titled Comic Pool, and started serializing the manga on a regular basis. The manga was selected for Comic Pool because it was the most popular work on Pixiv. On April 30, 2015, Ichijinsha started the publishing of the manga in print.

Media

Manga
The first volume was released on April 30, 2015 and eleven volumes have been published . The manga is licensed in English by Kodansha USA with each English volume containing two of the Japanese volumes, with the exception of Volume 11, which was released in English as a stand alone (labeled as Volume 6) as it was the final volume.

The manga is also licensed in Indonesia by M&C!.

Volume list

Anime
An anime television series by A-1 Pictures aired from April 13 to June 22, 2018 on Fuji TV. Produced by Aniplex, Fuji Television, Ichijinsha, Dentsu, Christmas Holly and Kanetsu Investment, the series was directed by Yoshimasa Hiraike, who also handled series composition. Takahiro Yasuda designed the characters, while Akimitsu Honma composed the music. Amazon streamed the series on their Amazon Prime Video service. The series ran for 11 episodes. An OVA entitled "It Appeared Suddenly=Love" was released on March 29, 2019 to coincide with the release of the seventh volume of the manga. A second OVA by Lapin Track was released on February 26, 2021 to coincide with the release of the tenth volume of the manga. A third OVA was released on October 14, 2021 to coincide with the release of the eleventh and final volume of the manga.

Episode list

Film

On July 26, 2018, a video promoting the sixth volume of the manga also revealed that a live-action film adaptation was in production.

On September 18, 2018, the cast for the film was revealed, starring Mitsuki Takahata and Kento Yamazaki as double leads Narumi and Hirotaka. It was distributed by Toho and released in Japanese theaters on February 7, 2020. The film ranked at number 1 in Japan on its opening weekend, with more than 389,000 tickets sold over the weekend.

Reception
The manga's compiled book volumes have frequently ranked on Oricon. Volume 2 was ranked first, and sold up to 208,765 copies in its first week. Volume 3 was ranked fourth, and sold up to 209,102 copies in its first week. Volume 4 was ranked first, and sold up to 283,523 copies in its first week. The manga had up to 4.2 million copies in print as of July 20, 2017. In 2015, the series won the first Next Manga Award in the web Manga category. The manga was ranked first in the 2016 edition of Kono Manga ga Sugoi! (This Manga Is Amazing!) guidebook. The manga was ranked ninth in the Zenkoku Shotenin ga Eranda Osusume Comic 2017 (Nationwide Bookstore Employees' Recommended Comics of 2017) poll on February 1, 2017. It was nominated for the 41st Kodansha Manga Award in the Best General Manga category. In September 2017, it won the Web Manga General Election.

Shiro Sagisu, the music composer for the 2020 live-action film adaptation, was awarded the Sandro Forte Award For Best Motion Picture Score by Montreal's 24th Fantasia International Film Festival.

Notes

References

External links
  
  
 
 

2014 manga
A-1 Pictures
Amazon Prime Video original programming
Ichijinsha manga
Japanese webcomics
Josei manga
Manga adapted into films
Noitamina
Otaku in fiction
Romantic comedy anime and manga
Webcomics in print
Workplace comics